Heating seasonal performance factor (HSPF) is a term used in the heating and cooling industry. HSPF is specifically used to measure the efficiency of air source heat pumps.

HSPF is defined as the ratio of heat output (measured in BTUs) over the heating season to electricity used (measured in watt-hours). It therefore has units of BTU/watt-hr.

The higher the HSPF rating of a unit, the more energy efficient it is. An electrical resistance heater, which is not considered efficient, has an HSPF of 3.41.

Depending on the system, an HSPF ≥ 9 can be considered high efficiency and worthy of a US Energy Tax Credit.

The HSPF is related to the non-dimensional Coefficient of Performance (COP) for a heat pump, which measures the ratio of heat energy delivered to electrical energy supplied, independently of the units used to measure energy. The HSPF can be converted to a seasonally-averaged COP by converting both the BTU heat output and the electrical input to a common energy unit (e.g. joules). Since 1 BTU = 1055.056 J, and 1 watt-hour = 3600 J, the seasonally-averaged COP is given by:

Avg COP = Heat transferred / electrical energy supplied = (HSPF * 1055.056 J/BTU) / (3600 J/watt-hour) = 0.29307111 HSPF.

For instance, a system which delivers an HSPF of 7.7 will transfer 2.25 times as much heat as electricity consumed over a season. In Europe the term Seasonal Performance Factor ("SPF") is used to mean the same as the average COP over the heating season. A system which transfers 2.25 times as much heat as the electricity consumed is said to have an SPF of 2.25. A well designed ground source heat pump installation should achieve an SPF of 3.5, or over 5 if linked to a solar-assisted thermal bank.

Example: For a heat pump delivering 120,000,000 BTU during the season, when consuming 15,000 kWh, the HSPF can be calculated as :

 HSPF = 120000000 (BTU) / (1000) / 15000 (kWh)
 HSPF = 8

See also
 Coefficient of Performance
 Heat Pump
 R-value (insulation)
 SEER

References

Energy conservation
Heating, ventilation, and air conditioning